Dalmore can refer to a number of locations, including:

In Scotland:
 Dail M%C3%B2r on the Isle of Lewis
 Dalmore House and Estate in East Ayrshire
 Dalmore Distillery, in Alness, producing The Dalmore single malt whisky
 Dalmore paper mill, near Auchendinny in Midlothian

In Australia:
 Dalmore, Victoria a locality in Australia 
 Dalmore railway station, now closed

In New Zealand:
 Dalmore, New Zealand, a suburb of Dunedin